Central African Republic competed at the 2019 World Aquatics Championships in Gwangju, South Korea from 12 to 28 July.

Swimming

Central African Republic entered one swimmer.

Women

References

Nations at the 2019 World Aquatics Championships
Central African Republic at the World Aquatics Championships
World Aquatics Championships